Abgarm Rural District is a rural district (dehestan) in Abgarm District, Avaj County, Qazvin Province, Iran. At the 2006 census, its population was 5,154, in 1,328 families.  The rural district has 19 villages.

References 

Rural Districts of Qazvin Province
Avaj County